The Zombie Bike Ride is a celebration of the bicycle on last week of October in Key West, Florida. Rock and roll, zombie bikes and costumes of all types and a one-mile leisurely ride along the Atlantic Ocean.

History
The first Zombie Bike Ride was created in 2009 by the local WeCycle bike shop, three local businessmen, Marky Pierson of Wonderdog Productions and Evan Haskell & Chris Needham of WeCycle, organized the ride to celebrate the bicycle in a unique and intuitive way. The Zombie Bike Ride was quickly growing, doubling with every year, from a couple hundred people to nearly 5,000 in 2013 and has escalated to 7,000 zombies in 2014.

Participants of the Zombie Bike Ride wear everything from dead-like face and body-paint and gory zombie costumes to surprisingly lively “walking dead” garb.

References

External links

Key West, Florida
Cycling events in the United States
Humour
Zombies and revenants in popular culture